Megan Wessenberg (born July 7, 1998) is an American figure skater. She placed sixth at a Grand Prix event, the 2018 Skate America. Earlier in her career, she was the 2016 U.S. junior national bronze medalist.

Early life 
Wessenberg was born on July 7, 1998 in Boston. After graduating from Newton North High School in 2017, she enrolled at Northeastern University, majoring in biology.

Skating career 
Wessenberg began learning to skate in 2003. Coached by Mark Mitchell and Peter Johansson, she debuted on the ISU Junior Grand Prix series in September 2015. In January, she won the junior bronze medal at the 2016 U.S. Championships.

Wessenberg finished 14th in the senior ranks at the 2017 U.S. Championships.

Representing the Skating Club of Boston, Wessenberg won gold at the Lake Placid Figure Skating Championships in July 2018. At the 2018 CS Ondrej Nepela Trophy, she placed seventh in the ladies competition, scoring 143.47 points. In October, she competed at a Grand Prix event, the 2018 Skate America. She finished second-highest of the three American entries in the ladies' competition, in sixth place.

In June 2020, Wessenberg switched disciplines to pair skating and left longtime coaches Mitchell and Johansson to train with Todd Sand and Jenni Meno in Irvine, California. While searching for a partner, she has been practicing pairs skills with Chris Knierim.

In January 2021, it was announced that she had teamed up with Blake Eisenach.

Programs

Competitive highlights 
GP: Grand Prix; Challenger Series; JGP: Junior Grand Prix

Pairs with Eisenach

Ladies Singles

Juvenile through novice career

References

External links 
 

1998 births
Living people
American female single skaters
Figure skaters from Boston
Newton North High School alumni